Man of the Forest may refer to:
 Man of the Forest (novel), a 1920 novel by Zane Grey
 Man of the Forest (1921 film), an American film
 Man of the Forest (1926 film), an American Western silent film
 Man of the Forest (1933 film), an American pre-Code film
 "Man of the Forest" (story), a story by Mikheil Javakhishvili

See also
 Men of the Forest, a 1952 documentary film